{{Infobox award|name=SIIMA Award for Best Female Debut  – Telugu|awardname=SIIMA Award for Best Female Debut -Telugu – Telugu|country=India|presenter=Vibri Media Group|producer=Vibri Media Group|established=2012|year=2012|description=Best performance by an actress in a leading role in her debut Telugu film|holder=Roopa Koduvayur for Uma Maheswara Ugra Roopasya|website= SIIMA Telugu|image=Shruti_Haasan_at_the_special_screening_of_the_short_film_Devi_(32).jpg|image caption=Shruti Haasan was the first recipient of the award|total_recipients=10 (as of 2021)}}

SIIMA Award for Best Female Debut – Telugu is presented by Vibri media group as part of its annual South Indian International Movie Awards, for the best acting done by a female actor in a leading role in her debut Telugu film. The award was first given in 2012 for films released in 2011.

 Superlatives 

 Winners 

 Nominations 

 2011: Shruthi Haasan – Anaganaga O Dheerudu Nithya Menen – Ala Modalaindi Isha Chawla – Prema Kavali Amala Paul – Bejawada Nikitha Narayan – It's My Love Story Sarah-Jane Dias – Panjaa 2012: Regina Cassandra – Siva Manasulo Sruthi
 Lavanya Tripathi – Andala Rakshasi Reshma Rathore – Ee Rojullo Gurshagun Kaur Sachdeva – Life Is Beautiful Monal Gajjar – Sudigadu 2013: Avika Gor – Uyyala Jampala
 Catherine Tresa – Chammak Challo Isha Talwar– Gunde Jaari Gallanthayyinde Priya Banerjee – Kiss Sharmila Mandre – Kevvu Keka 2014: Raashi Khanna – Oohalu Gusagusalade
 Kriti Sanon – 1: Nenokkadine Mishti Chakraborty – Chinnadana Nee Kosam Adah Sharma – Heart Attack Pooja Hegde – Oka Laila Kosam 2015: Pragya Jaiswal – Kanche Malavika Nair – Yevade Subramanyam Shruti Sodhi – Pataas Tridha Choudhury – Surya vs Surya Sayesha Saigal – Akhil 2016: Nivetha Thomas – Gentleman
 Keerthy Suresh – Nenu Sailaja Mehreen Pirzada – Krishna Gaadi Veera Prema Gaadha Niharika Konidela – Oka Manasu Anu Emmanuel - Majnu 2017: Kalyani Priyadarshan – Hello Aakanksha Singh – Malli Raava Megha Akash – LIE Nivetha Pethuraj – Mental Madhilo Shalini Pandey – Arjun Reddy 2018: Payal Rajput – RX 100
 Ashima Narwal – Natakam Kiara Advani – Bharat Ane Nenu Nabha Natesh – Nannu Dochukunduvate Nidhi Agerwal – Savyasachi Ruhani Sharma - Chi La Sow2019: Shivathmika Rajashekhar – Dorasaani
Priyanka Arul Mohan – Nani's Gang LeaderAnagha – Guna 369Divyansha Kaushik – MajiliAnanya Nagalla – Mallesham2020: Roopa Koduvayur – Uma Maheswara Ugra Roopasya
Varsha Bollamma – Choosi ChoodangaaneNoorin Shereef – Oollalla OollallaSalony Luthra – Bhanumathi & Ramakrishna''
Priyanka Sharma – Savaari

References 

South Indian International Movie Awards
Film awards for debut actress